The economy of Cameroon was one of the most prosperous in Africa for a quarter of a century after independence. The drop in commodity prices for its principal exports – petroleum, cocoa, coffee, and cotton – in the mid-1980s, combined with an overvalued currency and economic mismanagement, led to a decade-long recession. Real per capita GDP fell by more than 60% from 1986 to 1994. The current account and fiscal deficits widened, and foreign debt grew. Yet because of its oil reserves and favorable agricultural conditions, Cameroon still has one of the best-endowed primary commodity economies in sub-Saharan Africa.

Agriculture 

In 2018, Cameroon produced:

 5million tons of cassava (13th largest producer in the world);
 3.9million tonnes of plantain (3rd largest producer in the world, only behind Congo and Ghana);
 2.6million tons of palm oil (7th largest producer in the world);
 2.3million tons of maize;
 1.9million tons of taro (3rd largest producer in the world, second only to Nigeria and China);
 1.4million tons of sorghum;
 1.2million tons of banana;
 1.2million tons of sugarcane;
 1million tons of tomato (19th largest producer in the world);
 674,000 tonnes of yam (7th largest producer in the world);
 594,000 tons of peanut;
 410,000 tons of sweet potato;
 402,000 tons of beans;
 332,000 tons of rice;
 310,000 tons of pineapple;
 307,000 tons of cocoa (5th largest producer in the world, after Ivory Coast, Ghana, Indonesia and Nigeria);
 302,000 tons of potato;
 301,000 tons of onion;
 249,000 tons of cotton.

In addition to smaller productions of other agricultural products, such as coffee (33,000 tons) and natural rubber (55,000 tons).

Finance and banking

Cameroon's financial system is the largest in the CEMAC region. Access to financial services is limited, particularly for SMEs. Aside from a traditional tendency for banks to prefer dealing with large, established companies, determining factors are also found in interest rates for loans to SMEs being capped at 15 percent and being heavily taxed. As of 2006, bank loans to SMEs hardly reached 15 percent of total outstanding loans (Molua, 2002).

Less than 5 percent of Cameroonians have access to a bank account. While the microfinance sector is consequently becoming increasingly important, its development is hampered by a loose regulatory and supervisory framework for microfinance institutions (MFIs). The banking sector is highly concentrated and dominated by foreign commercial banks. 6 out of the 11 largest commercial banks are foreign-owned, and the three largest banks hold more than 50 percent of total financial system assets. While foreign banks generally display good solvency ratios, small domestic banks are in a much weaker position. Their capitalization is well below the average of banks in the CEMAC region and their profits are close to 2 percent, compared to 20 percent for foreign banks in the country. This is partially explained by the high levels of non-performing loans, which reached 12 percent in 2007, leading to most banks holding large amounts of excess reserves as a percentage of deposits and large levels of unutilized liquidity.

In 2018, Cameroon's financial system is being requested by the International Monetary Fund (IMF) to increase its tax base to cover the losses from the North-West and South-West Cameroon's regions instabilities, the loss of oil revenue, the failure to deliver on port facilities, and the decline in oil production from mature oil fields.

Macro-economic trend

Cameroon became an oil-producing country in 1977. Claiming to want to make reserves for difficult times, the authorities manage "off-budget" oil revenues in total opacity (the funds are placed in Paris, Switzerland and New York accounts). Several billion dollars are thus diverted to the benefit of oil companies and regime officials. The influence of France and its 9,000 nationals in Cameroon remains considerable. African Affairs magazine noted in the early 1980s that they "continue to dominate almost all key sectors of the economy, much as they did before independence. French nationals control 55% of the modern sector of the Cameroonian economy and their control over the banking system is total.

Recent signs, however, are encouraging. As of March 1998, Cameroon's fifth IMF program – a 3-year enhanced structural adjustment program approved in August 1997 – is on track. Cameroon has rescheduled its Paris Club debt at favorable terms. GDP has grown by about 5% a year beginning in 1995. There is cautious optimism that Cameroon is emerging from its long period of economic hardship.

The Enhanced Structural Adjustment Facility (ESAF) signed recently by the IMF and Government of Cameroon calls for greater macroeconomic planning and financial accountability; privatization of most of Cameroon's nearly 100 remaining non-financial parastatal enterprises; elimination of state marketing board monopolies on the export of cocoa, certain coffees, and cotton; privatization and price competition in the banking sector; implementation of the 1992 labor code; a vastly improved judicial system; and political liberalization to boost investment.

France is Cameroon's main trading partner and source of private investment and foreign aid. Cameroon has an investment guaranty agreement and a bilateral accord with the United States. USA investment in Cameroon is about $1 million, most of it in the oil sector. Inflation has been brought back under control. Cameroon aims at becoming emerging by 2035.

The government embarked upon a series of economic reform programs supported by the World Bank and International Monetary Fund (IMF) beginning in the late 1980s. Many of these measures have been painful; the government slashed civil service salaries by 65% in 1993. The CFA franc – the common currency of Cameroon and 13 other African states – was devalued by 50% in January 1994. The government failed to meet the conditions of the first four IMF programs.

This is a chart of trend of gross domestic product of Cameroon at market prices estimated by the International Monetary Fund with figures in millions of Central African CFA Francs.

The following table shows the main economic indicators in 1980–2022. Inflation below 5% is in green.

Gallery

See also
 Cameroon
 Transport in Cameroon
 United Nations Economic Commission for Africa

References

External links

Cameroon latest trade data on ITC Trade Map
World Bank Summary Trade Statistics Cameroon

 
Economics in developing countries
Cameroon
Cameroon